The Korg Poly-800 is a synthesizer released by Korg in 1983.  Its initial list price of $795 made it the first fully programmable synthesizer that sold for less than $1000.  It featured a 49 key non-velocity sensitive keyboard, two buttons for data entry, and a joystick controller, which could modulate the DCO pitch or the VCF.  Though the Poly-800 had MIDI, it did not feature MIDI SysEx functionality (except EX800 - the expander-version; or by modding the Poly800 with additionally selectable EX-firmware-ROM), and patches had to be backed up to cassette tape.  It had 8-voice polyphony (paraphony) with one DCO per voice. It could be switched into double mode which stacks two DCOs for a fuller sound, but reduces the polyphony to 4 voices. It featured one analog resonant low-pass VCF with 24 dB/oct which was shared for all voices. Like a monophonic synthesizer, the filter was switchable between single or multiple modes. In single mode, the first key pressed triggers the filter envelope, and unless all keys are released, the filter does not re-trigger. In multi mode, each key pressed in turn triggers the filter envelope, even if other keys are still pressed down. Further it had three digital envelope generators, a noise generator, an LFO, and a chorus effect. The Poly-800 could be run off batteries and had guitar strap pegs, allowing a performer to wear it like a guitar.  It was also available with reversed-colored keys, which gave an appearance similar to a Vox Continental organ.

Sequencer
It also sported a simple built in 256 step sequencer.

EX-800

About a year after the Poly-800 was introduced, a keyboardless, rackmount/tabletop version, called the EX-800, was released, adding limited MIDI SysEx capability. After production of the original keyboard ended in 1985, the enhanced Poly-800 MkII was released. It featured a digital delay instead of a chorus effect, and included limited MIDI SysEx functionality. It was produced until 1987.

Siel produced an almost identical synthesizer, the DK-70 around the same time period.

Modifications 

The low price for a used unit (in the 1990s it fell to under $200) and partial analog design of the Poly-800 made it appealing for modification by hobbyists. There is a modification that adds two knobs to the VCF, increasing the filter's range and expressiveness, known as the Moog-Slayer filter modification; the FM-800 filter modification which adds a pseudo Frequency modulation synthesis (FM) control to the filter; a modification for external audio input; and some users have added a switch to control the filter slope, adjusting it from a 4 pole (24db/oct) to a 2 pole (12db/oct).

It is also possible to install an additional EPROM containing the firmware of the EX800. That way it is possible to receive MIDI-sysex data, but keyboard-functionality will then be disabled. Before powering up the synthesizer users can select the firmware of choice by using a selective switch.

The most recent modification to the Poly-800 family is the Hawk-800 Firmware upgrade which is both a hardware and firmware modification, radically updating the features and capabilities of the synthesizer. There is also the AtomaHawk-800 which adds software and MIDI control to the more popular hardware modifications.

References

External links
 Synth Museum
 Vintage Synth Explorer
 Yahoo! group for users and abusers of KORG POLY 800 and EX800 synths
Korg poly800 resource info, sounds, pictures and mp3 demo
 New patches from AnalogAudio1 for the Poly-800 II

P
Analog synthesizers
Polyphonic synthesizers